Li Zhichao (Chinese: 李智超; Pinyin: Li Zhìchāo) is a professional Chinese footballer who plays as a midfielder.

Club career
Li Zhichao would start his football career playing for the various Dalian Shide F.C. youth teams before he was loaned out to the teams satellite youth team called Dalian Shide Siwu FC that was allowed to take part in Singapore's 2008 S.League. Li would soon return to Dalian Shide and within the 2008 Chinese Super League season he would make his debut for the club on June 25, 2008, in a league game against Liaoning Whowin in a 2–1 victory. After that game he would predominantly be used as a substitute until June 18, 2011, saw him eventually score his first goal for the club in a league game against Tianjin Teda F.C. that ended in a 1–1 draw.

The following season Li would struggle to make more of an impact and was loaned out to second-tier club Beijing Baxy on May 5, 2012. When Li returned to Dalian Shide the club was taken over by local rivals Dalian Aerbin. With the enlarged squad Li saw no playing time at Dalian Aerbin and was loaned out to third tier club Lijiang Jiayunhao until in February 2014, Li transferred to China League One side Beijing Baxy.

On January 21, 2015, Li transferred to Chinese Super League side Henan Jianye. On February 24, 2016, Li transferred to fellow Chinese Super League side Jiangsu Suning. On April 2, 2016, he made his debut for Jiangsu in a 1–1 away draw against Hebei China Fortune, coming on as a substitute for Sammir in the injury time.

On February 14, 2017, Li transferred to League One side Wuhan Zall. The following season, Wuhan won the 2018 China League One division.

Career statistics 
Statistics accurate as of match played December 31, 2019.

Honours
Wuhan Zall
China League One: 2018

References

External links
Player stats at Sohu.com
 

1989 births
Living people
Chinese footballers
Footballers from Dalian
Dalian Shide F.C. players
Beijing Sport University F.C. players
Dalian Professional F.C. players
Yunnan Flying Tigers F.C. players
Henan Songshan Longmen F.C. players
Jiangsu F.C. players
Wuhan F.C. players
Chinese Super League players
China League One players
Association football midfielders